WFWC-CD, virtual channel 45 (UHF digital channel 16), is a low-powered, Class-A 3ABN-affiliated television station licensed to Fort Wayne, Indiana, United States.

History

The station signed on on August 21, 1986, under the call sign W45AG as an affiliate of pay-per-view music video programmer, The Box.  On November 5, 2003, the station was granted Class A status by the Federal Communications Commission (FCC) and assigned the call letters WFWC-CA.  WFWC was sold to HC2 Holdings in 2018.

Digital channels
The station's digital signal is multiplexed:

See also
W26DH-D, sister station
WGLL, sister station
List of radio stations in Indiana
List of television stations in Indiana

References

External links

Innovate Corp.
FWC-CD
Television channels and stations established in 1986
Cozi TV affiliates
GetTV affiliates
Three Angels Broadcasting Network
Television stations in Indiana